The Hantzbahn was a  long narrow-gauge railway with a gauge of  from Saint-Blaise-la-Roche in Alsace over the Hantz Pass and beyond.

History 
The Hantzbahn was laid in 1916 during World War I by German troops, Russian prisoners of war and local civilians as a military light railway using prefabricated rail track panels with a length of 5 meters.

Route 
The light railway connected Saint-Blaise via the Hantz Pass with the front line at Ban-de-Sapt, in order to transport weapons, ammunition and supplies to the front and wounded soldiers in the opposite direction to the hospitals.

Operation 

The light railway line started operating in July 1916. The operation was organized according to a timetable with precise service instructions regarding the type of locomotives, the number of wagons, the speeds and the tonnages that had to be complied with depending on the section of the route. A total of 176 people were employed for the smooth operation of the six steam locomotives and four benzene locomotives as well as for the maintenance of the rail vehicles and tracks. It was single track line with eight stations, where trains could be crossed or overtaken using the double-track passing loops.

In the vicinity of the front line, the less powerful gasoline locomotives offered advantages over the 0-8-0 brigade locomotives, because the smoke was easy  to spot by the enemy. For better camouflage in the woodless area, camouflage tunnels were installed, which gave the station "Spanische Wand" its name, meaning paravent in German.

Remains 

In the post-war period, the tracks were dismantled and scrapped. The old customs house on the road to the Col du Hantz, the former border station at the top of the pass and the Chateau des St Louis on the D61 are still standing.

References

External links 
 
 A commemoration of the travels on railways that were built or operated by Kodeis B (commander of the railway troops) in the period from 28 May to 3 June 1918, Goswin von Haag, Captain & Commander of the Railway Troops

Railway lines in Grand Est
600 mm gauge railways in France
Railway lines opened in 1916
Railway lines closed in 1918